The 2022 Lithuanian Swimming Championships was held from 19 to 22 April 2022 in Klaipėda, Lithuania at the Klaipėda Swimming Pool. Events were competed in a long course (50 metres long) swimming pool. The meet was open to international competition.

Event schedule
A total of 41 events were competed over four days.

Overall results
Key:

Men's events

Women's events

Mixed events

Medal table

Records set

Women

See also
List of Lithuanian records in swimming

References

Citations

General 
Results

External links
Lithuanian Swimming Federation

2022
Sports competitions in Klaipėda
2022 in Lithuanian sport
2022 in swimming